Église Notre Dame Des Victoires is a Catholic church in San Francisco, California.  The church was founded in 1856 to serve the French Catholic immigrants during the Gold Rush. The architectural model for the church is the Basilique Notre-Dame de Fourvière in Lyon, France.  In 1887, Pope Leo XIII signed the decree placing Eglise Notre Dame des Victoires under the charge of the Marists and giving it the designation of being a French National Church.

The church building was rededicated in 1915 after rising from the ashes of the 1906 earthquake and great fire. In 1984, the church was designated as a historical landmark.

The church remains an important center of San Francisco's French community: it is located adjacent to the city's "French Quarter" centered on Belden Place and regularly conducts a Sunday mass in French.

Images

References

External links

Notre-Dame-des-Victoires

Roman Catholic churches in San Francisco
French-American culture in San Francisco
Roman Catholic churches in California
San Francisco Designated Landmarks
California Gold Rush
1856 establishments in California
Religious organizations established in 1856
Roman Catholic churches completed in 1906
20th-century Roman Catholic church buildings in the United States
Chinatown, San Francisco